Streptomyces hirsutus is a bacterium species from the genus of Streptomyces which has been isolated from soil in Switzerland. Streptomyces hirsutus produces prasinomycin and 8-deoxychalcomycin.

See also 
 List of Streptomyces species

References

Further reading

External links
Type strain of Streptomyces hirsutus at BacDive -  the Bacterial Diversity Metadatabase

hirsutus
Bacteria described in 1958